Azim Khamisa is a speaker and author of three books, the latest one being "The Secrets of the Bulletproof Spirit: How to Bounce Back from Life's Hardest Hits", published by Random House and coauthored with Jillian Quinn.

Khamisa was born in Kenya, Africa and had early training in mathematics, economics and international finance and was the Chairman, CEO and Founder of the Tariq Khamisa Foundation (TKF) and Founder and National Director of the Constant And Never Ending Improvement (CANEI) program. Committing his life to halting the continuing cycle of violence among the youth, Khamisa became a social activist after his son's death. His first book, "From Murder to Forgiveness" is about the death of his son. Khamisa founded the Tariq Khamisa Foundation to break the cycle of youth violence.

In 2010, Mithaq Kazimi produced a film about his life.

Khamisa was an advisory council member of the Fetzer Institute

Bibliography

References

External links
Stories

Azim Khamisa – Teaching Peace, Prosperity and Purpose Through the Practice of Forgiveness
Tariq Khamisa Foundation – Creating Safer Schools and Communities
Do One Thing - Heroes for a Better World
Luminary: Azim Khamisa | Shift In Action

American male writers
1959 births
Living people